1st Tukatovo (1-se Tükät) is a village in Nukayevsky Selsoviet, Kugarchinsky District, Bashkortostan, Russia. The population was 147 as of 2010. There are 2 streets.

Geography 
1st Tukatovo is located 32 km south of Mrakovo (the district's administrative centre) by road. Bustubayevo is the nearest rural locality.

References 

Rural localities in Kugarchinsky District